Sibaviatrans (Joint Stock Company SIAT) was an airline based in Krasnoyarsk, Russia. It operated scheduled and charter passenger and cargo flights from various locations around Russia. It also provided helicopter services. It was a member of AiRUnion alliance.

History 
The airline was established and started operations on 23 February 1995. It employed 557 staff.

It suspended operations at the end of September 2008 due to the AiRUnion collapse.

Destinations 
Sibaviatrans operated services to the following domestic scheduled destinations (at September 2008):

Abakan (Abakan International Airport)
Barnaul (Barnaul Airport)
Baykit (Baykit Airport)
Belgorod (Belgorod International Airport)
Bodaybo (Bodaybo Airport)
Bratsk (Bratsk Airport)
Chelyabinsk (Chelyabinsk Balandino Airport)
Dikson (Dikson Airport)
Igarka (Igarka Airport)
Irkutsk (Irkutsk Airport)
Kazan (Kazan International Airport)
Kemerovo (Kemerovo International Airport)
Krasnodar (Krasnodar International Airport)
Krasnoyarsk (Yemelyanovo Airport) hub
Motygino
Norilsk (Alykel Airport) main hub
Nizhnevartovsk (Nizhnevartovsk Airport)
Nizhny Novgorod (Nizhny Novgorod International Airport)
Novosibirsk (Tolmachevo Airport)
Novy Urengoy (Novy Urengoy)
Omsk (Tsentralny Airport)
Bor (Podkamennaya Tunguska Airport)
Severo-Yeniseysk (Severo-Eniseysk Airport)
Surgut (Surgut Airport)
Tura (Tura Airport)
Turukhansk (Turukhansk Airport)
Ufa (Ufa International Airport) 
Ulan-Ude (Ulan-Ude Airport)
Voronezh (Voronezh International Airport)
Yekaterinburg (Koltsovo Airport)

Fleet 
The Sibaviatrans fleet included the following aircraft (as of September 2008):

References

External links 

Sibaviatrans
Sibaviatrans aircraft

Defunct airlines of Russia
Companies based in Krasnoyarsk
Airlines established in 1995
Airlines disestablished in 2008
Russian companies established in 1995